Chloroclystis grisea is a moth in the  family Geometridae. It is found in Comoros, Kenya Mozambique and South Africa.

Host-plant of this species is Phyllanthus niruri

References

Moths described in 1897
Chloroclystis
Moths of Africa